Michael Granger (7 October 1931 – 6 November 2016) was an English professional footballer who played as a goalkeeper in the Football League for York City, Hull City and Halifax Town and in non-League football for Cliftonville and Scarborough. He died from complications of Alzheimer's disease at a nursing home in York in 2016.

References

1931 births
2016 deaths
Footballers from Leeds
English footballers
Association football goalkeepers
York City F.C. players
Hull City A.F.C. players
Halifax Town A.F.C. players
Scarborough F.C. players
English Football League players
Deaths from dementia in England
Deaths from Alzheimer's disease